Daniel Kaufmann (born 22 December 1990) is a Liechtensteiner former  footballer.

Career
Kaufmann joined FC Balzers senior side in 2008, and USV Eschen/Mauren in 2010.  He spent his whole career in Liechtenstein teams, with only a short bracket in Swiss-Italian team Chiasso, during 2016-17 season.

On 28 October 2021, he announced his retirement (to be effective as per following December) leaving both international and club activities at the age of only 30.

International career
He was a member of the Liechtenstein national under-21 football team and had 10 caps. Kaufmann received his first call-up to the senior team for the friendly against Estonia on 17 November 2010 and made his debut after being named in the starting 11.

International goals
Score and Result lists Liechtenstein's goal tally first

|-
| 1. || 31 March 2015 || Sportpark Eschen-Mauren, Eschen, Liechtenstein ||  ||  ||  || Friendly || 
|}

Honours

Club
FC Vaduz
 Swiss Challenge League (1): 2013–14
 Liechtensteiner Cup (4): 2012–13, 2013–14, 2014–15, 2015–16
USV Eschen/Mauren
 Liechtensteiner Cup (1): 2011–12

References

1990 births
Living people
Liechtenstein footballers
Liechtenstein international footballers
Liechtenstein under-21 international footballers
Swiss men's footballers
Swiss people of Liechtenstein descent
People with acquired Liechtenstein citizenship
Swiss Super League players
Swiss Challenge League players
FC Vaduz players
FC Balzers players
Association football central defenders